Dome Nunatak is a dome-shaped nunatak,  high, protruding above the Mackay Glacier, about  northwest of Mount Suess, in Victoria Land. It was charted and named by the British Antarctic Expedition, 1910–13, under Robert Falcon Scott.

References 

Nunataks of Victoria Land
Scott Coast